Udayapur Dhurmi  is a village development committee in Parsa District in the Narayani Zone of southern Nepal. At the time of the 2011 Nepal census it had a population of 7,163 people living in 1,085 individual households.

References

Populated places in Parsa District